Philip Bernard Turnbull (7 April 1879 – 20 October 1930) was a Welsh field hockey player from Cardiff, who competed in the 1908 Summer Olympics. In 1908 he won the bronze medal as member of the team Wales.

One of his sons, Maurice, played Test cricket for England and rugby union for Wales.

References

External links
 
Philip Turnbull's profile at databaseOlympics

1879 births
1930 deaths
Welsh male field hockey players
Olympic field hockey players of Great Britain
Field hockey players at the 1908 Summer Olympics
Olympic bronze medallists for Great Britain
Sportspeople from Cardiff
Olympic medalists in field hockey
Welsh Olympic medallists
Medalists at the 1908 Summer Olympics